Philippe Marçais (16 March 1910 – 31 May 1984) was a French Arabist and politician. The Arabist William Marçais was his father.

Works 
1952: Le parler arabe de Djidjelli (Nord constantinois, Algérie), Paris, Librairie d'Amérique et d'Orient, Publications de l'Institut d'Études Orientales d'Alger.
1954: Textes arabes de Djidjelli, text, transcription and translation, Paris, Presses Universitaires de France.
1977: Esquisse grammaticale de l'arabe maghrébin, Paris, Librairie d'Amérique et d'Orient.
1977: Textes d'arabe maghrébin, with MS.S Hamrouni, Paris, Librairie d'Amérique et d'Orient.
2001: Textes arabes du Fezzân, text and translation, Paris, Droz.

External links 
 Philippe Marçais on data.bnf.fr
 Philippe Marçais (1910 – 1984) on the site of the University of Liège
 Philippe Marçais on the site of the Assemblée Nationale
 Philippe Marçais on Biblio Monde
 Extrait des Textes arabes de Djidjelli de G Marçais 

1910 births
1984 deaths
People from Algiers
People of French Algeria
Pieds-Noirs
Deputies of the 1st National Assembly of the French Fifth Republic
French Arabists
Jean-Marie Le Pen
French orientalists
French military personnel of World War II
Members of the Organisation armée secrète
Chevaliers of the Légion d'honneur
Recipients of the Ordre des Palmes Académiques